The Limits of Control is a 2009 American film written and directed by Jim Jarmusch, starring Isaach de Bankolé as a solitary assassin, carrying out a job in Spain. Filming began in February 2008, and took place on location in Madrid, Seville and Almería, Spain. The film was distributed by Focus Features. It received mixed reviews, and as of May 17, 2020, had a 42% rating on the review aggregator Rotten Tomatoes, having been criticized for its slow pace and inaccessible dialogue while praising its beautiful cinematography and ambitious scope.

Plot

In an airport, Lone Man (Isaach de Bankolé) is being instructed on his mission by Creole (Alex Descas). The mission itself is left unstated and the instructions are cryptic, including such phrases as "Everything is subjective," "The universe has no center and no edges; reality is arbitrary," and "Use your imagination and your skills." After the meeting in the airport he travels to Madrid and then on to Seville, meeting several people in cafés and on trains along the way.

Each meeting has the same pattern: he orders two espressos at a cafe and waits, his contact arrives and in Spanish asks, "You don't speak Spanish, right?" in different ways, to which he responds, "No." The contacts tell him about their individual interests such as molecules, art, or film, then the two of them exchange matchboxes. A code written on a small piece of paper is inside each matchbox, which Lone Man reads and then eats. These coded messages lead him to his next rendezvous.

He repeatedly encounters a woman (Paz de la Huerta) who is always either completely nude or wearing only a transparent raincoat. She invites him to have sex with her but he declines, stating that he never has sex while he is working. One phrase that Creole, the man in the airport, tells him is repeated throughout the movie: "He who thinks he is bigger than the rest must go to the cemetery. There he will see what life really is: a handful of dirt." This phrase is sung in a peteneras flamenco song in a club in Seville at one point in his journey.

In Almería, he is given a ride in a pickup truck - driven by a companion of the Mexican (Gael García Bernal) - on which the words La vida no vale nada ('life is worth nothing') are painted, a phrase Guitar (John Hurt) says to him in Seville, and he is taken to Tabernas desert. There lies a fortified and heavily guarded compound. After observing the compound from afar, he somehow penetrates its defenses and waits for his target inside the target's office. The target (Bill Murray) asks how he got in, and he answers, "I used my imagination." After the assassination with a guitar string, he rides back to Madrid, where he locks away the suit he has worn throughout the movie and changes into a sweatsuit bearing the national flag of Cameroon. Before exiting the train station onto a crowded sidewalk he throws away his last matchbox.

Cast

Production

Jarmusch had the first idea about "a very quiet, very centered criminal on some sort of mission" 15 years prior to the release of the movie. Writing started with an idea for an actor, a character and a place and the rest was filled in afterwards. Isaach de Bankolé was to play a quiet centred criminal in the Torres Blancas apartment tower that Jarmusch himself first visited in the 80s. The filming was started with only what Jarmusch calls 'a minimal map', a 25-page story. The dialogues were filled in the night before each scene was shot. This was in fact the first of Jarmusch's films that took place entirely outside of the United States and there were some plans for the filming locations beginning in Madrid, then taking train south to Seville  and finally southeast to desert near the coastal town of Alméria.
 
Jarmusch cites novels about a professional criminal called Parker written by Richard Stark as an inspiration and also mentions that he loves John Boorman’s 1967 film Point Blank which was based on those novels.  Jacques Rivette's films were also used as inspiration for the plot full of disorienting cryptic clues with no clear solution. The title The Limits of Control comes from an essay of the same name by William S. Burroughs, which Jarmusch notes that he likes the double sense of: "Is it the limits to our own self-control? Or is it the limits to which they can control us, 'they' being whoever tries to inject some kind of reality over us?"  Jarmusch also employed the Oblique Strategies created by musician Brian Eno to reassure himself in the creative process, specifically the using phrases "Are these sections considered transitions?", "Emphasize repetitions.", and "Look closely at the most interesting details and amplify them," all of which were explicitly naming processes that they were doing during the filmmaking.

Many small details in the film have personal significance for Jarmusch. He had received the 'Le Boxeur' matchboxes as a gift, first from musicologist Louis Sarno, then from Isaach de Bankolé. The black pickup truck with the words "La Vida No Vale Nada" written on its back was modeled after a truck owned by Joe Strummer of the Clash, who had lived for some time in the south of Spain and also appeared in Jarmusch's 1989 film Mystery Train.

The aim of the film according to Jarmusch was to create an "action film with no action" and a "film with suspense but no drama". He states that the film has a rather cubist nature, is "interpretable in different ways, and they’re all valid," and that it is not his job to know what the film means.

Soundtrack
The soundtrack is created out of existing music selected by the director Jim Jarmusch. It includes drone-doom bands Boris and Sunn O))), adagio classical music as well as peteneras flamenco. For scenes that no suitable music could be found, Jarmusch's own band Bad Rabbit recorded new songs. The common characteristics of the used music is its overall slowness and rich musical landscape. Black Angel's "You on the Run" was even slowed down while maintaining the pitch to better fit the rest of the soundtrack. Music served as the inspiration for the atmosphere and editing of the film, guitar that appears in the story should represent a guitar that was used in 1920s by Manuel El Sevillano to record "Por Compasión: Malagueñas", lyrics from "El Que Se Tenga Por Grande" are referenced throughout the film.

References

External links
 
 
 
 
 The Limits of Control at The Jim Jarmusch Resource Page
 Los Limites del Control Spanish Site

2009 films
2009 crime drama films
2000s mystery films
American crime drama films
American mystery films
Films directed by Jim Jarmusch
Films shot in Madrid
Films shot in Almería
Focus Features films
2000s English-language films
2000s American films